Cereopsius quaestor is a species of beetle in the family Cerambycidae. It was described by Newman in 1842, originally under the genus Monohammus. It is known from the Philippines and Moluccas.

Varietas
 Cereopsius quaestor var. confluens Breuning, 1944
 Cereopsius quaestor var. luctuosus Pascoe, 1866
 Cereopsius quaestor var. nigrobasalis Kriesche, 1928
 Cereopsius quaestor var. tricinctus Pascoe, 1866

References

Cereopsius
Beetles described in 1842